Black Oak is the name of the following places in the U.S. state of Indiana:
Black Oak, Daviess County, Indiana
Black Oak, Lake County, Indiana